John Graham (12 April 1873 – April 1925) was an English footballer.

Career
Born in Derby, England, Jack Graham started off his football career playing for Cray Wanderers and Millwall Athletic of the Southern League. He later switched to playing for Woolwich Arsenal in September 1899, where he took up the defender position and was used as cover for Duncan McNichol, a Scottish footballer from Dumbartonshire. Graham made only one league appearance while he played for Arsenal, during a match against Gainsborough Trinity on 14 October 1899.

After leaving Arsenal, Graham transferred to Brentford for the 1900 close season, where he won the Southern League Second Division championship. He then transferred to Fulham in 1901, where he won another two Southern League Second Division championships. Graham also made 54 appearances in total for the Cottagers.

Honours 
Brentford
Southern League Second Division (1): 1900–01

Fulham
Southern League Second Division (2): 1901–02, 1902–03

References

1873 births
1925 deaths
Footballers from Derby
English footballers
Association football fullbacks
Cray Wanderers F.C. players
Millwall F.C. players
Arsenal F.C. players
Brentford F.C. players
Fulham F.C. players
Swindon Town F.C. players
Southern Football League players
English Football League players